Waghodia or Vaghodia is one of the taluka headquarters of Vadodara district in Gujarat state.

Demographics
As of Indian census 2001, Waghodia had a population of 13,480, where men are 7,108 while women are 6,372.

Administration
Waghodia is a village in the Vadodara district and taluka headquarters with same name.

People and culture
There are three main religion Hindu, Muslim and Jain. They celebrate every festival with full enjoy. Garba, Deepawali, Eid, Holi are the main festivals here. The town is a center for the nearby all villages.

Transport 
The usual mode of transport is state owned buses, although private buses are also a part of it, whereas for long journeys trains are preferred and the most preferred one station is Vadodara, which is approximately 28 km from the town.

Distance from Vaghodiya to Dabhoi is approximately 23 km; Vaghodiya to Bodeli approximately 40 km.

References

External links 

Cities and towns in Vadodara district

bn:তাখাতগড়
bpy:তাখাতগড়